Peet Limited is an Australian real estate development company focused on creating masterplanned residential communities and medium density and apartment developments for homebuyers across Australia.

The group has operations in Western Australia, New South Wales, Victoria, Queensland, South Australia, ACT and the Northern Territory. Headquarters are in Perth, Western Australia.1 The current Managing Director and Chief Executive Officer is Brendan Gore. He was appointed in 20072.

History 
The company was founded in 1895 as Peet and Bastow by James Thomas 'JT' Peet (1862-1935).4 James Peet was a surveyor and draughtsman who left England for Australia in 1888. After a short time in Queensland, he moved to Victoria where he established a real estate partnership with architect Austin Bastow in Melbourne. In the early 1890s Peet and Bastow turned their attention west, and in 1895 James Peet moved to Western Australia and established Peet and Company Ltd.3

In the late 1990s Peet and Co bought its first property in Victoria. In 2002, the company continued its eastern expansion buying its first property in Queensland. In 2004, Peet purchased its first piece of land in New South Wales and in August of that year listed on the Australian Stock Exchange (now the Australian Securities Commission) later in the same year.

In 2006, the company changed its name from Peet & Co to Peet Limited.4

In 2015, in its 120th year Peet Limited finalised the full acquisition of property group CIC Australia which expanded the company’s reach to all mainland Australian states and territories.5

Business
The Peet Group is involved in four main areas of the property development industry:

 Development of residential land estates.
 Development of completed homes, medium density townhouses and apartments.
 Development of commercial property such as shopping centre and community facilities.
 Provision of property investment options in residential communities and masterplanned communities via land syndication.

Peet has one of the biggest residential landbanks of any ASX listed property group with a gross development value of approximately $14 billion (AUD).7 As at 30 June 2018, the Group managed and marketed a land bank of more than 49,000 lots in the growth corridors of major mainland Australian cities.8

The Peet Group develops, manages and markets more than 60 projects, either as owned projects or in partnership with private and public sector. It has more than 70 industry awards for urban planning and design, environmental management, community development and affordability.9

Peet pioneered retail land syndication in Australia. Peet’s Funds Management division manages more than 20 syndicates.10

See also
 Googong, New South Wales
 Lakelands, Western Australia
 Carramar, Western Australia
 Burns Beach, Western Australia
 Alkimos, Western Australia
 Wellard, Western Australia
 Lightsview, South Australia
 Tonsley, South Australia
 Greenvale, Victoria
 Craigieburn, Victoria

References
[1] https://www.asx.com.au/asx/share-price-research/company/PPC/details

[2] https://www.businessnews.com.au/Person/Brendan-Gore

[3] ‘Brian Rogers, Peet 120 Years 1895-2015’

[4] “Our History” - www.peet.com.au/about-us/who-we-are/our-history

[5] https://www.propertyobserver.com.au/forward-planning/investment-strategy/property-news-and-insights/21730-peet.html

[7] “Peet Limited Annual Report 2018” - www.peet.com.au/-/media/peet/documents/corporate/corporate/2018/asx-announcements/annual_report_2018.ashx

[8] www.investsmart.com.au/shares/asx-ppc/peet-limited

[9] “Land Development and Industry Awards” www.peet.com.au/about-us/who-we-are/awards

[10] “Invest in a Peet Syndicate - www.peet.com.au/investor-centre/syndicates

External links
Peet official website

Companies listed on the Australian Securities Exchange
Real estate companies of Australia
Companies based in Perth, Western Australia
Real estate companies established in 1895
1895 establishments in Australia